Condensins are large protein complexes that play a central role in chromosome assembly and segregation during mitosis and meiosis (Figure 1). Their subunits were originally identified as major components of mitotic chromosomes assembled in Xenopus egg extracts.

Subunit composition

Eukaryotic types 

Many eukaryotic cells possess two different types of condensin complexes, known as condensin I and condensin II, each of which is composed of five subunits (Figure 2). Condensins I and II share the same pair of core subunits, SMC2 and SMC4, both belonging to a large family of chromosomal ATPases, known as SMC proteins (SMC stands for Structural Maintenance of Chromosomes). Each of the complexes contains a distinct set of non-SMC regulatory subunits (a kleisin subunit and a pair of HEAT repeat subunits). Both complexes are large, having a total molecular mass of 650-700 kDa.

The core subunits condensins (SMC2 and SMC4) are conserved among all eukaryotic species that have been studied to date. The non-SMC subunits unique to condensin I are also conserved among eukaryotes, but the occurrence of the non-SMC subunits unique to condensin II is highly variable among species.

For instance, the fruit fly Drosophila melanogaster does not have the gene for the CAP-G2 subunit of condensin II. Other insect species often lack the genes for the CAP-D3 and/or CAP-H subunits, too, indicating that the non-SMC subunits unique to condensin II have been under high selection pressure during insect evolution.
The nematode Caenorhabditis elegans possesses both condensins I and II. This species is, however, unique in the sense that it has a third complex (closely related to condensin I) that participates in chromosome-wide gene regulation, i.e., dosage compensation. In this complex, known as condensin IDC, the authentic SMC4 subunit is replaced with its variant, DPY-27 (Figure 2).
Some species, like fungi (e.g., the budding yeast Saccharomyces cerevisiae and the fission yeast Schizosaccharomyces pombe), lack all regulatory subunits unique to condensin II. On the other hand, the unicellular, primitive red alga Cyanidioschyzon merolae, whose genome size is comparable to those of the yeast, has both condensins I and II. Thus, there is no apparent relationship between the occurrence of condensin II and the size of eukaryotic genomes.
The ciliate Tetrahymena thermophila has condensin I only. Nevertheless, there are multiple paralogs for two of its regulatory subunits (CAP-D2 and CAP-H), and some of them specifically localize to either the macronucleus (responsible for gene expression) or the micronucleus (responsible for reproduction). Thus, this species has multiple condensin I complexes that have different regulatory subunits and display distinct nuclear localization. This is a very unique property that is not found in other species.

Prokaryotic types
Prokaryotic species also have condensin-like complexes that play an important role in chromosome (nucleoid) organization and segregation. The prokaryotic condensins can be classified into two types: SMC-ScpAB and MukBEF. Many eubacterial and archaeal species have SMC-ScpAB, whereas a subgroup of eubacteria (known as Gammaproteobacteria) including Escherichia coli has MukBEF. ScpA and MukF belong to a family of proteins called "kleisins", whereas ScpB and MukF have recently been classified into a new family of proteins named "kite".

Despite highly divergent primary structures of their corresponding subunits between SMC-ScpAB and MukBEF, it is reasonable to consider that the two complexes play similar if not identical functions in prokaryotic chromosome organization and dynamics, based on their molecular architecture and their defective cellular phenotypes. Both complexes are therefore often called prokaryotic (or bacterial) condensins. Recent studies report the occurrence of a third complex related to MukBEF (termed MksBEF) in some bacterial species.

Molecular mechanisms

Molecular structures

SMC dimers that act as the core subunits of condensins display a highly characteristic V-shape, each arm of which is composed of anti-parallel coiled-coils (Figure 3; see SMC proteins for details). The length of each coiled-coil arm reaches ~50 nm, which corresponds to the length of ~150 bp of double-stranded DNA (dsDNA). In eukaryotic condensin I and II complexes, a kleisin subunit bridges the two head domains of an SMC dimer, and binds to two HEAT repeat subunits (Figure 1).

Early studies elucidated the structure of parts of bacterial condensins, such as MukBEF and SMC-ScpA. In eukaryotic complexes, several structures of subcomplexes and subdomains have been reported, including the hinge and arm domains of an SMC2-SMC4 dimer, a CAP-G(ycg1)/CAP-H(brn1) subcomplex, and a CAP-D2(ycs4)/CAP-H(brn1) subcomplex. A recent cryo-EM study has shown that condensin undergoes large conformational changes that are coupled with ATP-binding and hydrolysis by its SMC subunits. On the other hand, fast-speed atomic force microscopy has demonstrated that the arms of an SMC dimer is far more flexible than was expected.

Molecular activities
Condensin I purified from Xenopus egg extracts is a DNA-stimulated ATPase and displays the ability to introduce positive superhelical tension into dsDNA in an ATP-hydrolysis-dependent manner (positive supercoiling activity). Similar activities have been detected in condensins from other organisms. The positive supercoiling activity is activated in vitro by Cdk1 phosphorylation, suggesting that it is likely one of the physiological activities directly involved in mitotic chromosome assembly. It is postulated that this activity of condensin I helps fold DNA and promotes topoisomerase II-mediated resolution of sister chromatids. Early single-DNA-molecule experiments also demonstrated in real time that condensin I is able to compact DNA in an ATP-hydrolysis dependent manner.

Most recently, single-molecule experiments have demonstrated that budding yeast condensin I is able to translocate along dsDNA (motor activity) and to "extrude" DNA loops (loop extrusion activity) in an ATP hydrolysis-dependent manner. In the latter experiments, the activity of individual condensin complexes on DNA was visualized by real-time fluorescence imaging, revealing that condensin I indeed is a fast loop-extruding motor and that a single condensin I complex can extrude 1,500 bp of DNA per second in a strictly ATP-dependent manner. It has been proposed that condensin I anchors DNA between Ycg1-Brn1 subunits and pulls DNA asymmetrically to form large loops. Moreover, it has been shown that condensin complexes can traverse each other, forming dynamic loop structures and changing their sizes.

It is unknown how condensins might act on nucleosomal DNA. Recent development of a reconstitution system has identified the histone chaperone FACT as an essential component of condensin I-mediated chromosome assembly in vitro, providing an important clue to this problem. It has also been shown that condensins can assemble chromosome-like structures in cell-free extracts even under the condition where nucleosome assembly is largely suppressed. This observation indicates that condensins can work at least in part on non-nucleosomal DNA in a physiological setting.

Only limited information is currently available as to the functional contribution of individual subunits of condensins to their activities. An SMC2-SMC4 dimer has an ability to reanneal complementary single-stranded DNA. This activity does not require ATP. For eukaryotic complexes, it has been reported that HEAT repeat subunits contribute to part of DNA binding and to the assembly of chromosome axes. Flexible and extendable nature of HEAT repeats could underlie the dynamic action of condensins and the architecture of mitotic chromosomes.

Mathematical modeling
Several attempts on mathematical modeling and computer simulation of mitotic chromosome assembly, based on molecular activities of condensins, have been reported. Representative ones include modeling based on loop extrusion, stochastic pairwise contacts and a combination of looping and inter-condensin attractions.

Functions in chromosome assembly and segregation

Mitosis

In human tissue culture cells, the two condensin complexes are regulated differently during the mitotic cell cycle (Figure 4). Condensin II is present within the cell nucleus during interphase and participates in an early stage of chromosome condensation within the prophase nucleus. On the other hand, condensin I is present in the cytoplasm during interphase, and gains access to chromosomes only after the nuclear envelope breaks down (NEBD) at the end of prophase. During prometaphase and metaphase, condensin I and condensin II cooperate to assemble rod-shaped chromosomes, in which two sister chromatids are fully resolved. Such differential dynamics of the two complexes is observed in Xenopus egg extracts, mouse oocytes, and neural stem cells, indicating that it is part of a fundamental regulatory mechanism conserved among different organisms and cell types. It is most likely that this mechanism ensures the ordered action of the two complexes, namely, condensin II first and condensin I later.

On metaphase chromosomes, condensins I and II are both enriched in the central axis in a non-overlapping fashion (Figure 5). Depletion experiments in vivo and immunodepletion experiments in Xenopus egg extracts demonstrate that the two complexes have distinct functions in assembling metaphase chromosomes. Cells deficient in condensin functions are not arrested at a specific stage of cell cycle, displaying chromosome segregation defects (i.e., anaphase bridges) and progressing through abnormal cytokinesis.

The relative contribution of condensins I and II to mitosis varies among different eukaryotic species. For instance, each of condensins I and II plays an essential role in embryonic development in mice. They have both overlapping and non-overlapping functions during the mitotic cell cycle. On the other hand, condensin II is non-essential for mitosis in the primitive alga C. merolae and the land plant A. thaliana. Curiously, condensin II plays a dominant role over condensin I in the C. elegans early embryos. This peculiarity could be due to the fact that C. elegans has a specialized chromosome structure known as holocentric chromosomes. Fungi, such as S. cerevisiae and S. pombe have no condensin II from the first. These differences among eukaryotic species provide important implications in the evolution of chromosome architecture (see the section of "Evolutionary implications" below).

It has recently become possible that cell cycle-dependent structural changes of chromosomes are monitored by a genomics-based method known as Hi-C (High-throughput chromosome conformation capture). The impact of condensin deficiency on chromosome conformation has been addressed in budding yeast, fission yeast, and the chicken DT40 cells. The outcome of these studies strongly supports the notion that condensins play crucial roles in mitotic chromosome assembly and that condensin I and II have distinct functions in this process. Moreover, quantitative imaging analyses allow researchers to count the number of condensin complexes present on human metaphase chromosomes.

Meiosis
Condensins also play important roles in chromosome assembly and segregation in meiosis. Genetic studies have been reported in S. cerevisiae, D. melanogaster, and C. elegans. In mice, requirements for condensin subunits in meiosis have been addressed by antibody-mediated blocking experiments and conditional gene knockout analyses. In mammalian meiosis I, the functional contribution of condensin II appears bigger than that of condensin I. As has been shown in mitosis, however, the two condensin complexes have both overlapping and non-overlapping functions, too, in meiosis. Unlike cohesin, no meiosis-specific subunits of condensins have been identified so far.

Chromosomal functions outside of mitosis or meiosis
Recent studies have shown that condensins participate in a wide variety of chromosome functions outside of mitosis or meiosis.
In budding yeast, condensin I (the sole condensin in this organism) is involved in copy number regulation of the rDNA repeat as well as in clustering of the tRNA genes. 
In fission yeast, condensin I is involved in the regulation of replicative checkpoint and clustering of genes transcribed by RNA polymerase III.
In C. elegans, a third condensin complex (condensin IDC) related to condensin I regulates higher-order structure of X chromosomes as a major regulator of dosage compensation.
In D. melanogaster, condensin II subunits contribute to the dissolution of polytene chromosomes and the formation of chromosome territories in ovarian nurse cells. Evidence is available that they negatively regulate transvection in diploid cells. It has also been reported that condensin I components are required to ensure correct gene expression in neurons following cell-cycle exit.
In A. thaliana, condensin II is essential for tolerance of excess boron stress, possibly by alleviating DNA damage. 
In mammalian cells, it is likely that condensin II is involved in the regulation of interphase chromosome architecture and function. For instance, in human cells, condensin II participates in the initiation of sister chromatid resolution during S phase, long time before mitotic prophase when sister chromatids become cytologically visible.
In mouse interphase nuclei, pericentromeric heterochromatin on different chromosomes associates with each other, forming a large structure known as chromocenters. Cells deficient in condensin II, but not in condensin I, display hyperclustering of chromocenters, indicating that condensin II has a specific role in suppressing chromocenter clustering. 
Whilst early studies suggested the possibility that condensins may directly participate in regulating gene expression, some recent studies argue against this hypothesis.
Mutants of the fission yeast Schizosaccharomyces pombe were obtained that had a temperature sensitive and/or DNA damage sensitive phenotype.   Some of these mutants were defective in the HEAT subunits of condensin indicating that the HEAT subunits are required for DNA repair.

Posttranslational modifications and cell cycle regulation
Condensin subunits are subject to various post-translational modifications in a cell cycle-dependent manner. Among these, phosphorylation in mitosis is the best studied.

Phosphorylation by Cdk1 is essential for condensin I’s supercoiling activity and chromosome assembly activity in vitro. However, the target subunits and sites (and number) of phosphorylation essential for activation are not known. S/TP sequences, the primary targets of Cdk1, tend to be enriched in intrinsically disordered regions (IDRs) located at the ends of condensin subunits, but their distribution and contribution to the regulation of condensin vary widely among different species. For example, in fission yeast, phosphorylation of the N-terminus of the SMC4 subunit regulates nuclear translocation of condensin during mitosis. In budding yeast, condensin localizes to the nucleus throughout the cell cycle, and phosphorylation of the N-terminus of the SMC4 subunit is involved in the regulation of chromosome association dynamics of condensin. In vertebrates, it has been proposed that N-terminal phosphorylation of the CAP-H subunit promotes mitosis-specific loading of condensin I. In addition to Cdk1, positive regulation by Aurora B and Polo and negative regulation by CK2 (casein kinase 2) have been reported.

Involvement of Cdk1, polo and Mps1 has been suggested for condensin II regulation. Moreover, the CAP-D3 subunit has been identified as a substrate of the protein phosphatase PP2A-B55. The full picture of the regulation of condensin II (as well as condensin I) by phosphorylation and dephosphorylation remains to be elucidated.

It has been reported that the CAP-H2 subunit of condensin II is degraded in Drosophila through the action of the SCFSlimb ubiquitin ligase.

Relevance to diseases
It was demonstrated that MCPH1, one of the proteins responsible for human primary microcephaly, has the ability to negatively regulate condensin II. In mcph1 patient cells, condensin II (but not condensin I) is hyperactivated, leading to premature chromosome condensation in G2 phase (i.e., before entering mitosis). There is no evidence, however, that misregulation of condensin II is directly related to the etiology of mcph1 microcephaly. More recently, it has been reported that hypomorphic mutations in condensin I or II subunits cause microcephaly in humans. In mice, hypomorphic mutations in condensin II subunits cause specific defects in T cell development, leading to T cell lymphoma. It is interesting to note that cell types with specialized cell division modes, such as neural stem cells and T cells, are particularly susceptible to mutations in condensin subunits.

Evolutionary implications
Prokaryotes have primitive types of condensins, indicating that the evolutionary origin of condensins precede that of histones. The fact that condensins I and II are widely conserved among extant eukaryotic species strongly implicates that the last eukaryotic common ancestor (LECA) had both complexes. It is therefore reasonable to speculate that some species such as fungi have lost condensin II during evolution.

Then why do many eukaryotes have two different condensin complexes? As discussed above, the relative contribution of condensins I and II to mitosis varies among different organisms. They play equally important roles in mammalian mitosis, whereas condensin I has a predominant role over condensin II in many other species. In those species, condensin II might have been adapted for various non-essential functions other than mitosis. Although there is no apparent relationship between the occurrence of condensin II and the size of genomes, it seems that the functional contribution of condensin II becomes big as the genome size increases. A recent, comprehensive Hi-C study argues from an evolutionary point of view that condensin II acts as a determinant that converts post-mitotic Rabl configurations into interphase chromosome territories. The relative contribution of the two condensin complexes to mitotic chromosome architecture also change during development, making an impact on the morphology of mitotic chromosomes. Thus, the balancing act of condensins I and II is apparently fine-tuned in both evolution and development.

Relatives 
Eukaryotic cells have two additional classes of SMC protein complexes. Cohesin contains SMC1 and SMC3 and is involved in sister chromatid cohesion. The SMC5/6 complex contains SMC5 and SMC6 and is implicated in recombinational repair.

See also 
 chromosome
 nucleoid
 mitosis
 meiosis
 cell cycle
 cohesin
 SMC protein
 ATPase
 HEAT repeat
 Topoisomerase II
 DNA supercoil

References

External links

 

Cell cycle
Mitosis
Protein complexes